Tom Brown (born December 5, 1936) is a former professional Canadian football player, and a former outstanding American college football player. He played collegiately at the University of Minnesota, and won the Outland Trophy in 1960 as the nation's best lineman. He played professional football with the BC Lions of the Canadian Football League, and was made a member of the Canadian Football Hall of Fame in 1984. Brown was inducted into College Football Hall of Fame in 2003.

Notes

1936 births
Living people
People from Albert Lea, Minnesota
Players of American football from Minnesota
Minnesota Golden Gophers football players
All-American college football players
College Football Hall of Fame inductees
American players of Canadian football
Canadian football defensive linemen
Canadian football linebackers
BC Lions players
Canadian Football Hall of Fame inductees